Cambuci (Cambuci Berry) is a municipality located in the Brazilian state of Rio de Janeiro. Its population was 15,514 (2020) and its area is 562 km². The calculated population for 2009 was 18,256. It is a popular destination for tourists.

References

Municipalities in Rio de Janeiro (state)